Kachgaria is a village in Bhatar CD block in Bardhaman Sadar North subdivision of Purba Bardhaman district in the state of West Bengal, India with total 211 families residing.

History
Census 2011 Kachgaria Village Location Code or Village Code 319853. The village of Kachgaria is located in the Bhatar tehsil of Burdwan district in West Bengal, India.

Transport 

Population 
Kachgaria village, most of the villagers are from Schedule Caste (SC). Schedule Caste (SC) constitutes 35.15% of total population in Kachgaria village. The village Kachgaria currently doesn't have any Schedule Tribe (ST) population.

Population and house data

Healthcare
Nearest Rural Hospital at Bhatar (with 60 beds) is the main medical facility in Bhatar CD block. There are primary health centers..

References

Villages in Purba Bardhaman district
West Bengal articles missing geocoordinate data